West Australian (1850–1870) was a British Thoroughbred racehorse and sire. In a racing career which lasted from October 1852 until June 1854 he ran ten times and won nine races. After being beaten on his debut, he won all his remaining starts including the 2000 Guineas, The Derby the St Leger and the Ascot Gold Cup. He has been retrospectively recognised as the first Triple Crown winner. West Australian was regarded by contemporary experts as one of the best British horses of the nineteenth century. After his retirement from racing he had some success as a sire of winners in England and France and was largely responsible for the survival of the Godolphin Arabian sire-line.

Background
West Australian was a "hard, yellow" bay horse standing 15.3 hands high with a narrow white blaze bred by John Bowes of Streatlam Castle, County Durham. He was described as having a "blood-like head... peculiar ears... good shoulders... clean-looking legs" and "plenty of bone". The New Sporting Magazine called him "one of the finest specimens of English racehorse ever seen". He was foaled in 1850, being by Melbourne the sire of seven classic winners. He was the second foal of his dam Mowerina, a daughter of Touchstone, who had finished second in the 1,000 Guineas Stakes and was a sister of the Derby winners Mundig and Cotherstone. Apart from West Australian Mowerina produced the winners Marley Hill (bl c 1851), Victoria (b f 1853), Go-Ahead Nassau Stakes, The Old Orange Girl (b f 1860 Kingston) thrice winner of the Bentinck Memorial Stakes, Baragah (ch c 1861 Stockwell) twice winner of the Bentinck Memorial Stakes and Ebor Handicap and Westwick (b c 1863 Stockwell).

Bowes sent West Australian into training with John Scott who trained forty classic winners at his base at Whitewall stables, Malton, North Yorkshire. He was ridden in most of his races by Frank Butler.

Racing record

1852: two-year-old season
West Australian was highly tried by Scott on the gallops at Malton before he appeared on a public course. In August 1852 he was pitted against the three-year-old Stewards' Cup winner Longbow in a trial race over six furlongs at weight-for-age terms and won easily by several lengths. Bowes was so impressed that he immediately took the express train to London where he backed his colt to win £30,000 in the following year's Derby.

The colt made his racecourse debut at the Newmarket Houghton meeting in late October when he started at odds of 5/2 and finished second to Speed-the-Plough in the Criterion Stakes. He was beaten by one length having been apparently unsuited by the slow early pace. Later in the same week he reversed the form with Speed-the-Plough when he started Evens favourite for the £700 Glasgow Stakes and won a more strongly run race by two lengths.

1853: three-year-old season
In the 2,000 Guineas Stakes on 26 April West Australian started 4/6 favourite in a field of seven runners. The race was run in heavy rain and the second favourite, Orinoco took an early lead with the rest of the field closely grouped. Inside the last quarter mile West Australian moved into the lead with the Duke of Bedford's colt Sittingbourne emerging as his only challenger. The two pulled clear of the field before West Australian gained the advantage and won comfortably by half a length.

On 25 May West Australian started 6/4 favourite for The Derby against twenty-seven opponents, despite having "tender feet" which made him unsuited by the prevailing hard ground. West Australian was ridden as usual by Frank Butler, who insisted on being the last to leave the paddock– a superstition he had acquired after Daniel O'Rourke's win in the previous year. The race began with an even start, and the very early running was made by Cheddar and Cineas, before Umbriel took the lead, with Butler settling West Australian towards the middle of the field. Early in the straight Umbriel began to tire and the lead was taken first by Rattle and then Cineas, while Butler moved into contention on the favourite closely followed by Sittingbourne. In the final furlong West Australian and Sittingbourne pulled clear of the rest and after a "very exciting" race, the favourite prevailed by a neck. Rataplan finished strongly to take third ahead of Honeywood and Rattle. Bowes, who was winning the race for the fourth time, won a first prize of £5,425.

On 13 September at Doncaster, West Australian attempted to become the first horse to win the 2000 Guineas, the Derby and the St. Leger Stakes. Although these three races were recognised as the most important races of the season for three-year-old colts, the term Triple Crown was not used until some years later. The only previous attempt by a winner of the Guineas and Derby to win the Leger had been ten years earlier, when Cotherstone, also trained by John Scott, had started odds-on favourite but had been beaten a head by Nutwith. When Frank Butler was told that some had expressed doubts about the Derby winner staying the distance he replied that "he'll stay a thundering deal too long for any of them: the faster they go the sooner it will be over". The race attracted nine other runners, including Sittingbourne who was accompanied by his pacemaker Feversham, and West Australian was made the 6/4 favourite. Sittingbourne took the early lead as Feversham struggled to reach the front and Butler settled the favourite towards the back of the field. The Reiver and Rataplan moved past Sittingbourne on the turn into the straight, with West Australian moving steadily closer. Butler moved the favorite up to challenge The Reiver a furlong from the finish and West Australian went clear "without the slightest effort" to win by three lengths with the rest of the runners finishing at wide intervals. The Yorkshire-trained winner was received with "a perfect hurricane of cheers" by the local supporters.

Bowes was able to claim two further prizes in the autumn of 1853 without having to run his colt in a race. Three days after his St Leger win, West Australian was allowed to walk over for a £200 Sweepstakes over the same course and distance when his twelve opponents were all withdrawn by their owners. At Newmarket in October the Derby winner again walked over, this time for the £850 Grand Duke Michael Stakes.

West Australian ended the season as the leading English money-winner with earnings of £10,950.

1854: four-year-old season
West Australian was scheduled to begin his four-year-old season with a match at Newmarket against Lord Glasgow's horse Barbatus, but Bowes was able to collect 250 guineas forfeit when Barbatus was withdrawn. West Australian was then sold for 5,000 guineas to Lord Londesborough.

At Royal Ascot in June West Australian beat Lord Eglington's horse Vanderdecken to win a Triennial Stakes. On the Thursday of the same meeting, West Australian ran in the Ascot Gold Cup in front of a crowd which included the Queen, Prince Albert and the Duke of Wellington. He won by a head from the five-year-old Kingston, with Rataplan third and was paraded past the Royal Stand after the race. At Goodwood on 25 July West Australian beat Mr Barber's horse Cobnut by twenty lengths to win a £300 Sweepstakes, but missed a race against the filly Virago in the Goodwood Cup.

Assessment
In May 1886 The Sporting Times carried out a poll of one hundred racing experts to create a ranking of the best British racehorses of the 19th century. West Australian was ranked in the top ten by sixty-three of the contributors, placing him second to Gladiateur who received sixty-five votes. In a related poll, the electors were asked to choose the single greatest horse they had ever seen. In this poll, West Australian finished third behind Gladiateur and Isonomy. John Scott regarded him either the best horse he had trained or as the second best after Touchstone while Frank Butler believed him to be the best horse he had ridden.

Stud record
West Australian was retired to stud for breeding purposes and stood at Kirkby, near Tadcaster, for a fee of 30 guineas, beside Stockwell. Here he sired The Oaks winner, Summerside and the 2,000 Thousand Guineas winner, The Wizard. In 1860 West Australian was sold for 4,000 guineas to Charles Auguste Louis Joseph, duc de Morny and sent to Haras de Viroflay in France.  After Morny died in 1862, West Australian was moved to the French National Stud at Haras du Pin.

His best progeny included:

West Australian died on 2 May 1870 at Haras du Pin in France.  A small stone memorial commemorating his victories was erected on the grounds of Bowes' Streatlam Castle.

Pedigree

See also
 List of leading Thoroughbred racehorses

References

1850 racehorse births
1870 racehorse deaths
Racehorses bred in the United Kingdom
Racehorses trained in the United Kingdom
Epsom Derby winners
Triple Crown of Thoroughbred Racing winners
Thoroughbred family 7-a
Godolphin Arabian sire line
2000 Guineas winners
St Leger winners